Marist School may refer to:

In the United States:
 Marist School (Georgia)
 Marist High School (Chicago, Illinois)
 Marist High School (New Jersey)
 Marist Catholic High School (Eugene, Oregon)

In other countries:
 Marist School (Marikina), the Philippines
 The Marist School, Sunninghill, Berkshire, England
 Marist Brothers International School, Kobe, Japan

See also 
 Marist College (disambiguation)